Taft E. Armandroff is an American astronomer, currently the Frank and Susan Bash Endowed Chair for the Director of the McDonald Observatory, at University of Texas at Austin.

References

Year of birth missing (living people)
Living people
University of Texas at Austin faculty
American astronomers
Wesleyan University alumni